The 2009 Speedway World Cup Qualification (SWC) was a two events of motorcycle speedway meetings used to determine the two national teams who qualify for the 2009 Speedway World Cup. According to the FIM rules the top six nations (Denmark, Poland, Sweden, Australia, Great Britain and Russia) from the 2008 Speedway World Cup were automatically qualified.

Results

Heat details

Qualifying Round 1 
2 May 2009 (21:00)
 Terenzano, Pista "Olimpia" (Length: 400 m)
Referee:  Christian Froschauer
Jury President:  Janos Nadasdi
Attendance:

Qualifying Round 2 
2 May 2009 (18:15)
 Daugavpils, Lokomotīve Stadium (Length: 373 m)
Referee:  Mick Bates
Jury President:  Andrzej Grodzki
Attendance:

See also 
 2009 Speedway World Cup

References 

Q